Marr Jill Diana Lovett (born 28 June 1944) is a former British female deaf swimmer. She represented Great Britain at the Deaflympics at the 1965 Summer Deaflympics in the women's 100m freestyle and women's 400m  freestyle finishing at 5th and 4th places respectively. She was married to the former President of the ICSD, John M. Lovett of Australia until his death in 2003.

References

External links 
Profile at Deaflympics

1944 births
Living people
British female swimmers
Deaf swimmers
British expatriates in Australia
British deaf people
20th-century British women